4-Hydroxy-2-oxopentanoaic acid, also known as 4-hydroxy-2-oxovalerate, is formed by the decarboxylation of 4-oxalocrotonate by 4-oxalocrotonate decarboxylase, is degraded by 4-hydroxy-2-oxovalerate aldolase, forming acetaldehyde and pyruvate and is reversibly dehydrated by 2-oxopent-4-enoate hydratase to 2-oxopent-4-enoate.

References

External links
 4-Hydroxy-2-ketovalerate, biocyc.org

Secondary alcohols
Alpha-keto acids
Hydroxy acids